Revelations is the fifth full-length studio album by the Futurepop band mind.in.a.box released on January 20, 2012 on Dreamweb Music, and again January 24, 2012 on Metropolis Records. In preparation for the album release, a video containing snippets from each song of the album was released on mind.in.a.box's Facebook page. An EP titled, "Revelations Club Mixes" was released on March 9, 2012.

Track listing

References

2012 albums
Mind.in.a.box albums